Burati is a village in the Republika Srpska, Bosnia and Herzegovina. According to the 1991 census, the village is located in the municipality of Rogatica.

References

See also
Valery Burati

Populated places in Rogatica